The Maine State Treasurer is a constitutional officer of the U.S. state of Maine.

The office is authorized by Article V, Part Third of the Maine Constitution. The Treasurer is chosen by the Maine Legislature in joint session for a two-year term; the officeholder can serve no more than four consecutive terms. Responsibilities of the Treasurer's Office include providing financial services for all state agencies, issuing bonds and managing the State's debt, as well as holding unclaimed property and working to return it to its rightful owners. The Treasurer is also an ex officio member of several state boards and agencies.

Governor Paul LePage proposed in 2015 to change how the State Treasurer is chosen from being chosen by the Legislature to a gubernatorial appointment and confirmation by the Legislature.

List of State Treasurers

References and external links
 List of Maine State Treasurers
Official Maine State Treasurer site
Constitution of Maine

References